Walter Seaforth Pack (30 December 1914 – 27 July 1974) was a British boxer who competed in the 1936 Summer Olympics. He fought as Wally Pack.

Boxing career
Pack won the 1936 Amateur Boxing Association British welterweight title, when boxing out of the Polytechnic Boxing Club.

In 1936 he was eliminated in the second round of the welterweight class after losing his fight to the upcoming silver medalist Michael Murach of Germany.

1936 Olympic results
 Round of 32: bye
 Round of 16: lost to Michael Murach (Germany) on points

References

Walter Pack's profile at the UK Olympic Committee
Walter Pack's profile at Sports Reference.com

1914 births
1974 deaths
Boxers from Greater London
Welterweight boxers
Olympic boxers of Great Britain
Boxers at the 1936 Summer Olympics
British male boxers